Castlekirk, also called Hen's Castle, is a tower house and National Monument located in Lough Corrib, Ireland.

Location

Castlekirk is located on a tiny island (0.18 ha or ½ acre) in the northwest corner of Lough Corrib, on the approach to Maum.

History
The castle was built early in the 12th century by the sons of Ruaidrí na Saide Buide (d. 1118) aided by William FitzAldelm and is one of the oldest mortared castles in Ireland.

The Lord Justice Sir Edmond Butler, in 1225, caused Odo O'Flatherty to give up Castlekirk to Aedh Ua Conchobair, King of Connaught; for assurance of his fidelity. The castle was knocked down by Fedlimid, son of Cathal Crobhdearg Ua Conchobair in 1233.

Gráinne Ní Mháille in 1546, at the age of sixteen, married Dónal an-Chogaidh O'Flaherty who, because of his aggressive behaviour, got the nickname ‘the Cock’ and she was in turn was called ‘the Hen’. When Donal was murdered she fought back with fury and with such determination the castle became known as ‘Hen’s Castle’, the name it still bears.

It continued to be occupied as a castle until it finally succumbed to Cromwellian soldiers in 1654.

In the 19th century this ruin was vandalised and its stones were removed to build houses in the area.

Legends
According to legend, the castle was built in a night by a cock and a hen. The Chief of the Name of Clan Ó Flaithbheartaigh and Lord of Iar Connaught, hired a witch to build it using magic. In a day and a night of casting spells she succeeded in creating the castle. She left a magic hen to look after it, warning that as long as the hen was looked after, the castle would remain secure. Everything went well until severe weather made life difficult and the inhabitants were forced to eat the hen.

Lady Jane Wilde tells of the folklore associated with Hen's Castle. In her work published in 1888, "Speranza" wrote the following:

Description
The rocks slope abruptly into the water on all sides.

References

External link

National Monuments in County Galway
Castles in County Galway